Going the Distance is a 2004 Canadian teen/comedy film directed by Mark Griffiths, and written by Eric Goodman and Kelly Senecal. A road movie set across Canada, its tagline was They came. They saw. They came. The film was released in Canada as Going the Distance, but for American release the film's title was expanded to National Lampoon's Going the Distance. The Canadian DVD release retains its original release title.

Produced by Brightlight Pictures and the first film underwritten in part by MuchMusic, Going the Distance was a brand extension for the music television channel and a foray into theatrical feature films by MuchMusic's then-corporate ownership CHUM Limited.

Recent changes to Telefilm Canada funding rewarded the producers of domestic films that were commercial successes in English Canada, and Going the Distance was a bid for such success.

Plot summary
Nick (Jacot), whose life seemed to be going perfectly, realizes he may lose his girlfriend Trish, to a famous music producer (Priestley). He sets out on a roadtrip from Tofino in west coast to go to the MuchMusic Video Awards in Toronto. Setting out in his RV along with two buddies (Tyler and Dime), for the road trip of their lives.

Cast
 Christopher Jacot – as Nick
 Shawn Roberts – as Tyler
 Ryan Belleville – as Dime
 Jason Priestley – as Lenny Swackhammer
 Joanne Kelly – as Sasha
 Mayko Nguyen – as Jill
 Katheryn Winnick – as Trish
 August Schellenberg - as Emile 
 Avril Lavigne – as Herself
 Matt Frewer – as Farmer Joseph
 Iris Graham – as Shy girl
 Crystal Lowe – as French Waitress
 Jackie Burroughs - as Mother Libby

Cameos 
 Avril Lavigne – performing artist
George Stroumboulopoulos – as VJ
 Gob – performing band
 Prevail – performing band
 Swollen Members – performing band

Soundtrack

The Going The Distance OST was available soon after the movie was released.

Notes 
  Andrew Jenks, Corin Dingley and Kelvin Swaby were erroneously credited as the songwriters.

References

External links
 
 

2004 films
English-language Canadian films
2000s English-language films
Canadian teen comedy films
National Lampoon films
Canadian comedy road movies
2000s comedy road movies
Films set in Montreal
Films set in Toronto
2000s teen comedy films
Films set in Vancouver
Brightlight Pictures films
Films directed by Mark Griffiths (director)
2000s Canadian films